The London Riders' Championship was an individual speedway competition for top riders of teams from London. It was a very prestigious competition, especially in its early days. However, as the number of teams from London dwindled, so did interest in the competition.  The last competition was held in 1983.

An attempted revival of the Championship was made in 2011 at the Arena Essex Raceway speedway track in Purfleet , Essex , where the riders taking part represented not their current clubs, but long-defunct London clubs including West Ham , New Cross , Wembley and Walthamstow. It was staged there as the track, home of the Lakeside Hammers was the closest track to London staging speedway at the time. However, the meeting was abandoned after only a few  heats due to heavy rain and was never restaged.

Winners

* 1963 - Provincial League London Riders Championship

References

Speedway competitions in the United Kingdom
Speedway in London